"Out in the Real World" is the only single by Stream of Passion, released on February 27, 2006, from their album Embrace the Storm.

As the whole album Embrace the Storm, the song was written by Marcela Bovio and composed by Arjen Anthony Lucassen.

Track listing 
Out in the Real World – 3:51
Computer Eyes (Ayreon cover) – 6:03
Pain (Ayreon cover) – 4:48
When the Levee Breaks (Kansas Joe McCoy and Memphis Minnie cover) – 5:42

Performance on the charts

External links
Stream of Passion official website

2006 singles
Stream of Passion songs
Compositions by Arjen Anthony Lucassen